Joaquín Vallejo Arbeláez (2 October 1912 — 31 December 2005) was a Colombian civil engineer, businessman and writer who served as 12th Permanent Representative of Colombia to the United Nations, and held various ministries during the Military Junta and the National Front in Colombia. As Colombian Minister of Foment in 1957 during the administration of General Gabriel París Gordillo, he helped design and implement the mechanism that would eventually become known as the Vallejo Plan, a business plan that would allow Colombian companies to import raw materials, specialized equipment, and industrial machinery with duty-free exemptions or lowered tariffs, if those materials and/or equipment would go towards producing marketable exporting goods, as an incentive to industrialize the national economy and open up to international markets.

Personal life
Joaquín Vallejo Arbeláez was born in Rionegro, Antioquia on 4 October 1912 to Antonio José Nestor Vallejo Mejía and Zoraida Dolores Arbeláez Echeverri. He married his first cousin Nelly Mejía Arbeláez, with whom he had ten children, nine of them surviving into adulthood: María Eugenia, Luz Marina, María Cristina, María Inés, Nestor Francisco, Jesús Alberto, Rosario del Pilar, José Joaquín, and Pablo.

Selected works

References

External links
 Álvarez Morales, Víctor; Esteban Vélez, Sergio (2010). . Medellín Chamber of Commerce. Retrieved 2010-12-29.

1912 births
2005 deaths
People from Rionegro
Colombian Liberal Party politicians
Ministers of Finance and Public Credit of Colombia
Colombian Ministers of Foment
Colombian Ministers of Government
Permanent Representatives of Colombia to the United Nations
Colombian civil engineers
20th-century Colombian businesspeople